Kilwinning railway station is a railway station serving the town of Kilwinning, North Ayrshire, Scotland. British Transport Police maintain an office here.

The station has the most frequent service in Ayrshire, being served by all trains on both the Ayr main line and the branches to Ardrossan Harbour and Largs, with the sole exception of 1K49 17:47 Glasgow Central to Ayr which runs non-stop from Paisley to Irvine.

History 
The station was opened on 23 March 1840 by the Glasgow, Paisley, Kilmarnock and Ayr Railway and was built as an interchange, seeing traffic coming from Glasgow, Ayr and Ardrossan (and later Largs).

Station facilities
There is a staffed ticket office (open Monday - Saturday 06:05 - 23:30 Sunday 08:50- 23:30), a toilet, a kiosk, a waiting room and a ticket vending machine. Train running information is offered via digital CIS displays, automated announcements, timetable posters and customer help points on each platform. In 2012, a new 130-space car park opened. In 2019 the station went under accessibility upgrades to add lifts to a new crossbridge and step-free access to all platforms.

Station usage
The station is popular with commuters travelling to Glasgow from Ayrshire and beyond. It is the last stop before the Ayrshire Coast line splits in two, so trains stop at this station more than any other in Ayrshire.

British Transport Police

The station houses a Neighbourhood Policing Team (NPT) from the British Transport Police. Officers from Kilwinning cover all stations south of Kilwinning and north of Kilwinning until ; Police Scotland officers will cover if British Transport Police officers are not available.

Bus services

Services

2022

The Sunday service is:
 3 trains per hour to 
 2 trains per hour to 
 1 train per hour to 
 4 trains per day to

Rail and sea connections

Northern Ireland
Trains connect Ayr along the Glasgow South Western Line to Stranraer where a bus link runs: route 350 operated by Macleans Coaches (except Sundays) to Cairnryan. for onward ferries to the Port of Belfast by Stena Line and Larne Harbour by P&O Ferries.

Isle of Arran
Trains also connect along the Ayrshire Coast Line to Ardrossan Harbour for the Caledonian MacBrayne service to Brodick.

References

Notes

Sources

External links
Video footage - History of Kilwinning Station.

Railway stations in North Ayrshire
Former Glasgow and South Western Railway stations
Railway stations in Great Britain opened in 1840
Railway stations served by ScotRail
SPT railway stations
Kilwinning